Toaster Strudel is the brand name of a toaster pastry convenience food, prepared by heating the frozen pastries in a toaster and then spreading the included icing packet on top. The brand is historically notable for being stored frozen, due to innovations in 1980s food manufacturing processes.

History
The Toaster Strudel is marketed under the Pillsbury brand, formerly of the Pillsbury Company. The product has found considerable success since being deployed in 1985 as competition with Kellogg's Pop-Tarts brand of non-frozen toaster pastries. In 1994, the company launched the advertising slogan "Something better just popped up".  , the company increased the foreign branding, launching a brand ambassador character named Hans Strudel, and the new slogan of "Get Zem Göing". 
In 2001, General Mills acquired the Toaster Strudel product line with its purchase of Pillsbury. In 2023, General Mills used the advertising slogan, "Gooey. Flaky. Happy".

Varieties
Toaster Strudels come in several flavors, with strawberry, blueberry, and apple flavors being the most common varieties. They also come in flavors such as cinnamon roll, chocolate, and boston cream pie. In 2020, the company released a limited-edition "Mean Girls" Toaster Strudel, which featured pink icing instead of the brand's traditional white icing.

In popular culture
In the 2004 film Mean Girls, it was fictionally claimed that Gretchen Wieners' family fortune was due to her father's invention of the Toaster Strudel.

See also

 Convenience food
 List of brand name snack foods
 Pop-Tarts
 Strudel

References

External links
 
 
 

Brand name snack foods
Pastries
General Mills brands
Convenience foods
Products introduced in 1985
American snack foods